Moose Jaw was a federal electoral district in Saskatchewan, Canada, that was represented in the House of Commons of Canada from 1908 to 1953 and from 1968 to 1988.

This riding was created in 1907 from parts of Assiniboia West and Calgary ridings. It was abolished in 1952 when it was redistributed into Assiniboia, Moose Jaw—Lake Centre  and Rosetown—Biggar ridings.

It was re-created in 1966 from parts of Assiniboia, Moose Jaw—Lake Centre, Rosetown—Biggar, Rosthern, Saskatoon, and Swift Current ridings. The electoral district was abolished in 1987 when it was redistributed into Moose Jaw—Lake Centre and Regina—Lumsden ridings.

Election results

|-

|Opposition-Labour
|SOMERVILLE, James ||align=right|2,946

By-election: On Mr. Johnson's election being declared void, 22 February 1923

See also 

 List of Canadian federal electoral districts
 Past Canadian electoral districts

External links 
 
 

Former federal electoral districts of Saskatchewan